Gareth Jones OBE (born 14 May 1939) is a Welsh politician. He was a member of the National Assembly for Wales for the Conwy from 1999 until 2003 when he lost by 72 votes. He sought a successful re-election to the newly created Aberconwy constituency in 2007 before retiring in 2011. He was also a Llandudno town councillor representing the Craig-y-Don ward.

In July 2007 he was elected Chair of the Assembly's new Enterprise and Learning Committee.

Prior to winning the Aberconwy constituency he was the cabinet member for finance and resources and the leader of the Plaid Cymru party group on Conwy County Borough Council.

On 26 September 2010 Gareth Jones announced that he would not be standing for election in the 2011 National Assembly for Wales elections.

Personal
Gareth Jones was born in Blaenau Ffestiniog but now lives in Craig-y-Don, a suburb of Llandudno. A former headmaster of Ysgol John Bright, Llandudno's secondary school, he graduated with a BA from the University of Wales, Swansea. Gareth Jones' political interests include social justice, the Welsh language and education. His hobbies include reading and walking. His wife formerly owned a local bookshop.

Political career
Between 1999 and 2003, Jones was a member of the National Assembly for Wales for the then constituency of Conwy and was Shadow Minister for Education and later chairman of the Education Committee. In the 2003 Assembly election, he lost his seat by the narrow margin of 72 votes to Labour's Denise Idris Jones amid allegations of electoral fraud by Royal Mail (after they failed to deliver some 11,000 of his electoral leaflets to parts of Llandudno and surrounding areas).

In 2007, in the new constituency of Aberconwy that was created following boundary changes, Jones defeated the Conservative candidate, Dylan Jones-Evans by a margin of 1,700 votes, as well as Denise Idris Jones who came in third place. Jones mainly campaigned in the run up to the election against potential downgrading of services at Ysbyty Llandudno hospital (as well as against the proposed Gwynt-y-Môr off-shore windfarm and for affordable housing).  He stood with the ballot paper description Plaid Cymru - Save Llandudno Hospital. Following Jones's victory, the local Labour Party spokesperson described this as dishonest "scaremongering", claiming that the hospital was not under threat of closure under the incumbent Labour Welsh Assembly Government.

He has also held several posts within his political party, Plaid Cymru – the Party of Wales, including being a member of the National Executive Committee.

Prior to his re-election he was an active member of the Llandudno Hospital Action Group, and a Trustee of Llandudno's St David's Hospice. He remains a board member of Aberconwy Women's Aid and of the National Welsh Language and Heritage Centre at Nant Gwrtheyrn, Chair of Deganwy Chapel, and Patron of Tyddyn Bach, a respite centre for HIV patients and families in Penmaenmawr.

On 26 September 2010 Gareth Jones announced that he would not be standing for election in the 2011 National Assembly for Wales elections.

References

External links
Plaid Cymru Website 
BBC News
National Assembly for Wales Register of Members Interests 
National Assembly for Wales

Offices held

People from Blaenau Ffestiniog
Councillors in Wales
Plaid Cymru members of the Senedd
Wales AMs 1999–2003
Wales AMs 2007–2011
Officers of the Order of the British Empire
Plaid Cymru politicians
Alumni of Swansea University
1939 births
Living people
Welsh-speaking politicians